Emma Montiel (born 12 July 1975) is a Gibraltarian long-distance runner. In 2018, she competed in the women's half marathon at the 2018 IAAF World Half Marathon Championships held in Valencia, Spain. She also competed at the 2016 IAAF World Half Marathon Championships held in Cardiff, United Kingdom.

In 2014, she represented Gibraltar at the 2014 Commonwealth Games held in Glasgow, Scotland in the women's 10,000 metres event. She finished in last place out of 13 competitors.

References

External links 
 

Living people
1975 births
Place of birth missing (living people)
Gibraltarian sportswomen
Athletes (track and field) at the 2014 Commonwealth Games
Commonwealth Games competitors for Gibraltar